Yasmine Pahlavi (née Etemad-Amini,; born 26 July 1968), is the wife of Reza Pahlavi, the last crown prince of the former Imperial State of Iran.

Biography
Yasmine Etemad-Amini was born in Pars Hospital in Tehran, Iran, on July 26, 1968. She attended the private Tehran Community School until the rising tensions in the late 1970s forced her family to leave Iran permanently. They settled in the San Francisco area of California, where she attended and matriculated at Notre Dame High School.

She is a graduate of George Washington University, obtaining a BA degree in political science, and a juris doctor degree from its Law School. She is a member of the Maryland Bar Association.

She worked for ten years as a staff attorney for Children's Law Center in Washington, D.C., representing the rights of at-risk and underprivileged youth. She was also the co-founder and a director of the Foundation for the Children of Iran. Founded in 1991, the purpose of the Foundation is to provide health care services to Iranian children or children of Iranian origin regardless of race, color, creed, religious or political affiliation. She resigned her leadership role and any affiliation with the Foundation in February 2014. In November 2018, she announced that she had breast cancer.

Marriage and children

Yasmine married Reza Pahlavi on 12 June 1986, and the couple have three daughters:

Noor Pahlavi, born 
Iman Pahlavi, born 
Farah Pahlavi, born 

The family lives in the United States.

Politics
Yasmine Pahlavi has been a vocal supporter of the democracy movement in Iran, appearing at several pro-democracy rallies occurring after the 2009 election upheaval and Iranian Green Movement in Iran.

References

External links

 

Yasmine
1968 births
Living people
Iranian royalty
Iranian emigrants to the United States
Lawyers from Washington, D.C.
George Washington University Law School alumni
Columbian College of Arts and Sciences alumni
Pahlavi princesses
Princesses by marriage
Mohammad Reza Pahlavi
People from Tehran